ESC Corporate Services is a private Ontario corporation that acts as a licensed government service provider under contract with the Ministry of Government Services (MGS). This company is best known by Canadian law firms and the business community as the direct link to the government, whereby ESC Corporate Services acts as a facilitator of regulatory compliance by providing access to government records, government's registration and filing services. The most widely used government services facilitated by ESC Corporate Services include Incorporations, PPSA searches, registrations, Security Searches and trade name registrations.

General Information 

ESC Corporate Services is a licensed service provider under contract with the MGS. Licensed service providers under MGS contract have exclusive rights to facilitate access to government registries (records databases) and registration services in Ontario and across Canada. As such, ESC Corporate Services is licensed to legally provide a variety of government services to the legal and business communities. The contract with the MGS does not prohibit the development of any proprietary and value added services that a Licensed Service Provider deems necessary in order to retain its market share and improve its operational and customer service quality.

Formation of ESC Corporate Services 

ESC Corporate Services was established in January 2010 and started providing government services to the public as a licensed service provider under contract with the Government of Ontario. ESC Corporate Services' headquarters is located in the King Street and Spadina Avenue area of Toronto, Ontario.

Government Services Facilitated by ESC Corporate Services 

Its contract with MGS gives ESC exclusive right to facilitate access to the following government services for the legal and corporate community as a Licensed Service Provider:

Incorporation: Provincial, Federal and nationwide filing of Articles of Incorporation, Amendment and Dissolution.

Registrations and Filings of Corporate trade names, Small business, court documents and PPSA securities.

Government Database Searches which include ONBIS and Business Name searches, Corporate name searches and registrations via NUANS, PPSA and PPSA+ searches, Security searches, Real Estate searches and Birth/Death Certificate, Marriage Licence and MTO searches.

ESC's Role in Regulatory Compliance

Anti-Money Laundering 
Following the enactment on December 31, 2008 of the New Client Identity & Verification Requirements under By-Law 7.1 introduced by The Law Society of Upper Canada all financial institutions, lawyers and paralegals are required to verify their client's identity in an attempt to prevent money laundering activities. ESC Corporate Services developed its "Know Your Client" service - a service to verify corporate entities as a means to facilitate compliance with the Anti-Money Laundering Federal regulations.

On May 10 and 11, 2011, ESC exhibited at the 10th Annual Forum on Anti-Money Laundering hosted by The Canadian Institute in Toronto where the following subjects were covered:

 Conducting inherent risk analysis
 Anti-Money Laundering in trade finance
 Anti-Money Laundering for mutual fund and portfolio managers and
 Tax evasion as a new predicate offence

College of Physicians and Surgeons of Ontario 

In order to facilitate compliance with the College of Physicians and Surgeons of Ontario's (CPSO) requirement for all physicians to submit their annual renewal based on the anniversary date of the Certificate of Authorization, ESC provides assistance to the members of the medical community with completion of their Annual Renewal through providing the means for obtaining their Certificates of Status together with the Annual Renewal Application which are required by the CPSO in order to obtain their Certificate of Authorization.

Corporate Partners 

ESC has partnered with the Government of Ontario and Loan Transact in order to develop a number of proprietary services offered to its legal and business customers throughout Canada.

References 

Ontario government departments and agencies